List of television stations in Chile:

Free-to-air terrestrial television stations

News channels

Local channels (by region)

Santiago Metropolitan Region

Arica y Parinacota Region

Tarapacá Region

Antofagasta Region

Atacama Region

Coquimbo Region

Valparaíso Region

O'Higgins Region

Araucanía Region

Los Ríos Region

Los Lagos Region

Magallanes Region

See also 
 Television in Chile

Further reading

External links 
 Regional cable channels

Chile
Television stations